Shannon Turner (born 8 September 1997) is a footballer who plays as a goalkeeper for Wolverhampton Wanderers. Born in England, she has represented Northern Ireland at under-19 level. She is on the Northern Ireland squad for UEFA Women's Euro 2022.

Life 
Turner was born and brought up in Solihull in the West Midlands.

Turner has played for a number of leading English football clubs, including Birmingham City W.F.C.

She joined the Wolves in August 2021.

She was the only uncapped player named to play for the Northern Ireland women's national football team for the UEFA Women's Euro in 2022. She qualified to play for Northern Ireland as some of her grandparents were from there. The other two goalkeepers in the squad are Jackie Burns and Becky Flaherty. Turner said that joining the squad had inspired her to try to be the top Northern Ireland goalkeeper.

References 

1997 births
Living people
Women's association footballers from Northern Ireland
Women's association football goalkeepers
UEFA Women's Euro 2022 players
Sportspeople from Solihull
English women's footballers
Birmingham City W.F.C. players
Wolverhampton Wanderers W.F.C. players
English people of Northern Ireland descent